Langtree is a rural locality and the site of a discontinued railway station in the central northern part of the Riverina. The railway station was about 8 kilometres north of Goorawin and 22 kilometres south of Hillston.

References

Towns in the Riverina